The Sri Lankan Ambassador to Russia is the Sri Lankan envoy to Russia. The Sri Lankan Ambassador to Russia is concurrently accredited as Ambassador to Armenia, Belarus, Kazakhstan, Moldova, Ukraine and Uzbekistan.

Ambassadors

Ambassador to the Soviet Union

Ambassador to Russia

See also
 Sri Lankan Ambassador to the Soviet Union
 List of heads of missions from Sri Lanka

References

External links
Embassy of Sri Lanka, Russia

Sri Lanka
Russia